is an Aten (NEO) asteroid, estimated to be about  in diameter, that was first observed on 9 October 2019, and flew pass the Earth at , about  away, its closest encounter in 115 years, on 14 October 2019 at 6:53 pm ET.

Trajectory

See also 
 Chelyabinsk meteor

References

External links 
 
 
 

Minor planet object articles (unnumbered)
Discoveries by MLS
Near-Earth objects in 2019
20191009